David J. Burke (born November 8, 1948, in Raleigh, North Carolina) is an American executive producer, screenwriter and film and television director.

Burke has produced Law & Order: Special Victims Unit, seaQuest DSV, TriBeCa, and other shows.

Filmography

As director
Wiseguy (1989) – One episode, "Sins of the Father"
TriBeCa (1993) – One episode, "Honor"
seaQuest DSV (1994–1995) – Two episodes, "Alone", "The Good Death"
Edison (2005)
Animal (2005)
The Prosecution of an American President (2012)

References

External links

Living people
1948 births
American male screenwriters
American film directors
American television directors
American television producers
Monmouth University alumni